The Motorsport UK British Rallycross Championship is an auto racing Rallycross series, running in the United Kingdom.  From 2020 the championship became known as the Motorsport UK British Rallycross Championship 5 Nations Trophy presented by Cooper Tire.

The championship is recognised as an official Championship by Motorsport UK which is the governing body of Motorsport in Great Britain.

The current format consists of the Motorsport UK Supercars (600Hp+ Vehicles with 4WD based upon hatchbacks), The Supernational and All4Mini's, the BMW Mini Class, the Retro Rallycross, the Swift Sport, Swift Junior championship and RX150s.

History

The first Rallycross event was organised at Lydden circuit, near Canterbury in Kent, on Saturday 4 February 1967.

Originally intended as a one off conceived by Robert Reed, a producer on ABC TV's World of Sport programme and organised for the broadcaster by the Tunbridge Wells centre of the 750 Motor Club under the leadership of Bud Smith, the event was such a huge success that more TV specials soon followed. And it wasn't long before 'clubmans' events were being run for autocross, race and rally drivers who'd become captivated by the new sport.

The first event was won by Vic Elford – already a successful rally driver and someone who would go on to drive in F1 and have great success as a sports car racer – driving a Porsche 911 owned by AFN, at that time the official Porsche importer for Great Britain.

It is claimed that the foot and mouth outbreak of 1967, which caused the cancellation of that year's RAC Rally, gave rise to Rallycross. However, Rallycross had been born in February 1967 and the November foot and mouth disease actually prevented some drivers attending the first Rallycross event to be staged at Croft, near Darlington in County Durham, on 30 December 1967.

There is a link to the abandoned RAC British Rally of 1967. A televised Rallycross had been organised to take place following the rally. However, following its cancellation, most of the foreign drivers and teams left Britain and the Rallycross lost many of its expected star entries. The event still took place and was won by Rootes Group driver Andrew Cowan.

With the bit firmly between its teeth, ITV ran a championship season through the winter of 1967–68, the winner of which, and the first man ever to win a Rallycross championship was Welshman Tony Chappell.

ITV's monopoly on the sport, its man Reed had thought up, was lost in August 1968 when the BBC struck a deal with Lydden owner Bill Chesson giving them virtually exclusive access to events at the Kentish track. ITV moved North, basing itself at Croft and later added events at Cadwell Park, near Louth in Lincolnshire.

The television companies first fought over Rallycross then ignored it. ITV was gone by the middle '70s and BBC's coverage had declined to one or two events a year by the time it dropped the British round of the European Rallycross Championship from its roster a decade later. The British Rallycross Grand Prix was the last event to be shown by the national broadcaster but that too ended after the 1994 event – the last to be run at Brands Hatch and in the event's traditional winter slot.

Rallycross spread to Europe within a couple of years of its creation and in 1973 the 'Embassy European Trophy' was won by Scotsman John Taylor in an Escort RS1600. The first officially sanctioned European Rallycross Championship followed in 1976 – won by Austria's Franz Wurz in a Lancia Stratos – the same year that Britain got its official British Rallycross Championship, won by Trevor Hopkins in an Escort RS1800.

Past champions
 2022 – Patrick O'Donovan (Ford Fiesta VII 4x4 T16)
 2021 – Derek Tohill (Ford Fiesta VII 4x4 T16)
 2020 – Mark Donnelly (Citroen DS3 4x4 T16)
 2019 – Julian Godfrey (Ford Fiesta VI 4x4 T16)
 2018 – Mark Higgins (Peugeot 208 4x4)
 2017 – Nathan Heathcote (Citroen DS3 4x4 T16)
 2016 – Dan Rooke (Citroen DS3 4x4 T16)
 2015 – Julian Godfrey (Ford Fiesta VI 4x4 T16)
 2014 – Julian Godfrey (Ford Fiesta VI 4x4 T16)
 2013 – Julian Godfrey (Ford Fiesta VI 4x4 T16)
 2012 – Julian Godfrey (Ford Fiesta VI 4x4 T16)
 2011 – Julian Godfrey (Ford Fiesta VI 4x4 T16)
 2010 – Pat Doran (Ford Fiesta VI 4x4 T16)
 2009 – Pat Doran (Ford Fiesta VI 4x4 T16)
 2008 – Lawrence Gibson (MG Metro 6R4)
 2007 – Ollie O'Donovan (Peugeot 306 4x4 T16)
 2006 – Christopher Evans (Opel Astra 4x4 T16)
 2005 – Pat Doran (Ford Fiesta VI 4x4 T16)
 2004 – Dermot Carnegie (Ford Focus I 4x4 T16)
 2003 – Dermot Carnegie (Ford Focus I 4x4 T16)
 2002 – Pat Doran (Ford RS200)
 2001 – Dermot Carnegie (Ford Focus I 4x4 T16)
 2000 – Lawrence Gibson (MG Metro 6R4)
 1999 – Dermot Carnegie (Ford Escort)
 1998 – Helmut Holfeld (Peugeot 306 S16)
 1997 – Will Gollop (Peugeot 306 S16)
 1996 – Will Gollop (Peugeot 306 S16)
 1995 – Dermot Carnegie (MG Metro 6R4)
 1994 – Dermot Carnegie (MG Metro 6R4)
 1993 – Mike Turpin (MG Metro 6R4)
 1992 – Denis Biggerstaff (MG Metro 6R4)
 1991 – Will Gollop (MG Metro 6R4)
 1990 – Steve Palmer (MG Metro 6R4)
 1989 – Michael Shield (MG Metro 6R4)
 1988 – Mark Rennison (Ford RS200)
 1987 – Mark Rennison (Ford RS200)
 1986 – John Welch (Ford Escort)
 1985 – Trevor Hopkins (?)
 1984 – John Welch (Ford Escort)
 1983 – Keith Ripp (Ford Fiesta)
 1982 – Keith Ripp (Ford Fiesta)
 1981 – Keith Ripp (Ford Fiesta)
 1980 – Graham Hathaway (Ford Fiesta)
 1979 – Bruce Rushton (?)
 1978 – Trevor Hopkins (?)
 1977 – Trevor Hopkins (?)
 1976 – Trevor Hopkins (?)

References

External links
 

Rallycross
Rallycross racing series
National championships in the United Kingdom